Campbell Macmillan (born 16 April 1982) is a Zimbabwean cricketer. He played twenty first-class matches between 2000 and 2005.

See also
 CFX Academy cricket team

References

External links
 

1982 births
Living people
Zimbabwean cricketers
CFX Academy cricketers
Midlands cricketers
Matabeleland cricketers
Manicaland cricketers
Sportspeople from Harare